Clangers (usually referred to as The Clangers) is a British stop-motion children's television series, consisting of short films about a family of mouse-like creatures who live on, and inside, a small moon-like planet. They speak only in a whistled language. They eat only green soup (supplied by the Soup Dragon) and blue string pudding. The programmes were originally broadcast on BBC1 between 1969 and 1972, followed by a special episode which was broadcast in 1974.

The series was made by Smallfilms, the company set up by Oliver Postgate (who was the show's writer, animator and narrator) and Peter Firmin (who was its modelmaker and illustrator). Firmin designed the characters, and Joan Firmin, his wife knitted and "dressed" them. The music, often part of the story, was provided by Vernon Elliott.

A third series, narrated by Monty Python actor Michael Palin, was broadcast in the UK in June 2015 on the BBC's CBeebies TV channel, gaining hugely successful viewing figures, following on from a short special broadcast by the BBC earlier that year. The new programmes are still made using stop-motion animation (instead of the computer-generated imagery which had replaced the original stop-motion animation in revivals of other children's shows such as Fireman Sam, Thomas & Friends and The Wombles). Further new series were made in 2017 and 2019.

Clangers won the British Academy Children's Award for Pre-School Animation in 2015.

Background
The Clangers originated in a series of children's books developed from another Smallfilms production, Noggin the Nog. Publishers Kay and Ward created a series of books based on the Noggin the Nog television episodes, which was subsequently expanded into a series called Noggin First Reader, aimed at teaching children to read.

In one of these, called Noggin and the Moonmouse, published in 1967, a new horse-trough was put up in the middle of the town in the North-Lands. A spacecraft hurtled down and splash-landed in it: the top unscrewed, and out came a largish, mouse-like creature in a duffel coat, who wanted fuel for his spaceship. He showed Nooka and the children that what he needed was vinegar and soap-flakes, so they filled up the fueltank of the little spherical ship, which then "took off in a dreadful cloud smelling of vinegar and soap-flakes, covering the town with bubbles".

In 1969 (the year of NASA's first landing on the Moon), the BBC asked Smallfilms to produce a new series for colour television, but without specifying a storyline. Postgate concluded that as space exploration was topical the new series should take place in space (and, inspired by the real Moon Landing, Peter Firmin designed a set which strongly resembled the Moon). Postgate adapted the Moonmouse from the 1967 story, by simply removing its tail ("because it kept getting into the soup"). Hence the Clangers looked similar to mice (and, from their pink colour, pigs). They wore clothes reminiscent of Roman armour, "against the space debris that kept falling onto the planet, lost from other places, such as television sets and bits of an Iron Chicken", and they spoke in whistled language.

Storyline
The Clangers was described by Postgate as a family in space. They were small creatures living in peace and harmony on – and inside – a small, hollow planet, far, far away: nourished by Blue String Pudding, and by Green Soup harvested from the planet's volcanic soup wells by the Soup Dragon.

The word "Clanger" is said to derive from the sound made by opening the metal cover of one of the creatures' crater-like burrows, each of which was covered with an old metal dustbin lid, to protect against meteorite impacts (and space debris). In each episode there would be some problem to solve, typically concerning something invented or discovered, or some new visitor to meet. Music Trees, with note-shaped fruit, grew on the planet's surface, and music would often be an integral feature in the simple but amusing plots. In the Fishing episode, one of the Cheese Trees provided a cylindrical five-line staff for notes taken from the Music Trees.

Postgate provided the narration, for the most part in a soft, melodic voice, describing and accounting for the curious antics of the little blue planet's knitted pink inhabitants, and providing a "translation", as it were, for much of their whistled dialogue. Postgate claimed that in reality when the Clangers' were whistling, they were "swearing their little heads off".

Production

The first of the 26 episodes (aired as two series of 13 programmes each) was broadcast on BBC1 from 16 November 1969. The last edition of the second series was transmitted on 10 November 1972.

However, there was also one final programme, a seven-minute election special entitled Vote for Froglet, broadcast on 10 October 1974 (the day of the General Election). Oliver Postgate said in a 2005 interview that he wasn't sure whether the 1974 special still existed, and it has been referred to as a "missing episode". In fact the whole episode is available from the British Film Institute.

The original Mother Clanger puppet was stolen in 1972. Today, Major Clanger and the second Mother Clanger are on display at the Rupert Bear Museum.

The Clangers grew in size between the first and last episodes, to allow Firmin to use an Action Man model figure in the episode "The Rock Collector".

BBC's CBeebies channel and the American pre-school channel, Sprout, produced a new series for broadcasting in their 2015 schedules, with Michael Palin narrating in place of the late Oliver Postgate. The American pre-school channel Sprout were major funders and co-producers having commissioned the series in tandem with the BBC, with William Shatner narrating.

In November 2015, The Clangers won the Best Pre-school Animation award at the BAFTAs.

Awards

Characters
The principal characters are the Clangers themselves, the females wearing waistcoats and the males brass armour:

 Granny Clanger: an elderly Clanger, she is fond of knitting and often falls asleep. She wears a black tabard in the original show, but a lilac one in the new version. She is also Major Clanger's mother.
 Major Clanger: the father and head of the family, he is determined to get all things right on their planet, and can be grumpy. He wears brass armour. Narrator of the 2015 series, Michael Palin, said that Major Clanger is one of his favourite characters.
 Mother Clanger: mother to Tiny Clanger and Small Clanger, Mother Clanger is the matriarch of the family and is often seen preparing and dispensing the Clangers' soup or Blue String Pudding, though her favourite thing to do is gardening. She wears a red tabard.
 Small Clanger: the son of Mother and Major Clanger, and the older brother of Tiny Clanger, Small Clanger is very inquisitive and inventive, which - despite his best intentions - has sometimes led to some element of chaos amongst the Clangers, the soup pump being a classic example. Small Clanger is often the focus of the episodes, as he is the most adventurous of the family. He wears brass armour in the original show, but wears a blue tabard in the new version.
 Tiny Clanger: youngest of the family, daughter to Mother and Major Clanger, and younger sister to Small Clanger, Tiny Clanger often plays a key role in the episodes too. She has a kind and gentle nature, that is apparent in many episodes in which a new visitor arrives, as she usually tries to communicate peacefully with them. She wears a red tabard in the original show. This changed to a bright pink one in the first series of the new version before turning to a reddish pink in later series.
 Three other Clangers, two males with different coloured hair and a female wearing blue, also appear in the original episodes, but they have been dropped for the 2015 revival.

Other inhabitants
 The Soup Dragon: a benign, female creature with a penchant for Green Soup. The Soup Dragon dwells in the soup wells within the Clangers' planet. She is often summoned by tapping on the top of what look like small inactive volcanoes; she slides the lid back, and then takes a jug from (usually) Small Clanger, which she fills for them to eat. A green glow is visible beneath her when she emerges, suggesting the presence of a substantial lake of green soup.
 Baby Soup Dragon: the Soup Dragon's son, Baby Soup Dragon was brought into the Clangers' world when the Soup Dragon became broody, which meant the Clangers could not get any soup. Tiny Clanger called the Iron Chicken by radio, for advice, and she told Tiny to get the egg which she had left on the surface of the planet and to fill it with ingredients. Then they made a nest with macaroni sticks, not far from the soup wells, and placed the egg in the middle. The Iron Chicken asked the Clangers to stand back while she shot the iron egg with a beam from her nest: this had an effect, and the Soup Dragon saw the egg and instinctively sat upon it, moments after the beam was shut off. Then the Soup Dragon was startled and leapt up to find that the egg was hatched and she had a Baby Soup Dragon.
 Froglets: a trio of small orange aliens with black, stalk-like legs and large eyes, who travel around in a top hat. In the 2015 series, they can change colour to yellow and blue (and, on one occasion, Green). In "The Medal", a series 3 episode of the revived series, 6 froglets can be seen together, and in series 2, one episode has 4, including the green one.
 The Cloud: a cotton-wool cloud that floats over the surface of the planet, releasing musical raindrops. In the 2015 series, it displays the ability to change its shape.
 The Music Trees: the two small Music Trees are a permanent fixture on the surface of the Clangers' planet. They sit in a small divot on the surface (in the 2015 series, they sit atop a small hill) and are often harvested by the Clangers for their musical notes, although the Clangers always politely ask the trees first, after which the trees release some of their notes onto the ground, suggesting some form of sentience.
 The Glow Buzzers: lightbulb-like creatures which live around the Clangers' caves, in hives that they fill with "Glow Honey". They helped Small Clanger find his way out of the flower caves when he followed them one time to find out where they got the Glow Honey from. The Glow Buzzers are rendered digitally in the new series.
 The Iron Chicken: a "bird" made of scrap metal (modelled from Meccano), which lives in an orbiting nest made of metallic junk. The pieces were found around the Smallfilms studio.
 The Iron Chick: the Iron Chicken's chick, who appeared in two episodes of series 2, and in the 2015 series.
 Sky Moos: large, flying, blue cow-like creatures that appear in several episodes. They are always hungry, which can come in handy.
 The Singing Flowers: a pair of singing flowers introduced in the 2015 series who are friends of Tiny Clanger.

Visitors
Other characters appeared in only one or two episodes each:
 Hoots: small horn-like creatures with three legs, speaking like trumpets.
 A Spaceman: an astronaut  who arrives to collect rock samples. Upon landing, the Clangers observe his movements and discover that he is digging up rocks. Small Clanger peeks out of a hole and takes the wicker basket he is (rather humorously) placing the collected rocks in. The astronaut turns to find his basket gone and begins to look for it, searching the surface until he lifts the lid off one of the holes only to find Tiny Clanger within. This clearly scares the astronaut, who proceeds to run away, and falls straight down one of the holes into the planet where he then falls into a soup well. After the Clangers retrieve him and clean him up, he appears to be still in shock, as he then begins to run around again in panic, at which point he accidentally runs himself into orbit around their planet. Small Clanger retrieves him with a fishing rod and a magnet. 
 Lunar Rover: the rover appeared when the Clangers were building a structure on the surface and one of them noticed an incoming object. They all dived below for safety, and on impact the rover destroyed the structure they were building, much to the Clangers' annoyance. They all observed the rover, staying just out of its sight. When it began to dig - and seemingly eat - some of the surface, Major Clanger intervened and stopped it. It then turned to face him and they attempted to shake hands, at which point the Rover's "nose" came off in Major Clanger's hand. He tries to return it, but the Rover drives off, finds a suitable bit of ground, then launches itself back into space. Major Clanger exclaims that it is "Marvellous".
 Eggbots: a group of egg-shaped, nesting doll-like robots who make sounds based on the solfège scale (each smaller Eggbot emitting a successive musical note).
 Metal Caterpillar: a metallic caterpillar who hatched from a metal egg which Small Clanger found in space. It ate anything that was metal, until it wove a cocoon and became a moth.
 Wols: metallic colorful owls, who fly by spinning. The Iron Chicken had to look after three baby Wols whilst their parent was away
 The Tin Bird visited the Clangers' planet during an episode of the 2017 series, looking for a place to build a nest.

Music and sound effects
One of the most noted aspects was the use of sound effects, with a score composed by Vernon Elliott under instructions from Postgate. Although the episodes were scripted, most of the music used in the two series was written in translation by Postgate in the form of "musical sketches" or graphs that he drew for Elliott, who converted the drawings into a musical score. The music was then recorded by the two, along with other musicians – dubbed the Clangers Ensemble – in a village hall, where they would often leave the windows open, leading to the sounds of birds outside being heard on some recordings. Much of the score was performed on Elliott's bassoon, and also included harp, clarinet, glockenspiel and bells.

The distinctive whistles made by the Clangers, performed on swanee whistles, have become as identifiable as the characters themselves, much imitated by viewers. The series creators have said that the Clangers, living in vacuum, did not communicate by sound, but rather by a type of nuclear magnetic resonance, which was translated to audible whistles for the human audience. These whistles followed the rhythm and intonation of a script in English. The action was also narrated by a voice-over from Postgate. However, when the series was shown without narration to a group of overseas students, many of them felt that the Clangers were speaking their particular language.

Postgate recounted: "When the BBC got the script, [they] rang me up and said "At the beginning of episode three, where the doors get stuck, Major Clanger says 'sod it, the bloody thing’s stuck again'. Well, darling, you can't say that on children's television, you know, I mean you just can't". I said "It's not going to be said, it's going to be whistled", but [they] just said "But people will know!" I said no, that if they had nice minds, they'd think "Oh dear, the silly thing's not working properly". If you watch the episode, the one where the rocket goes up and shoots down the Iron Chicken, Major Clanger kicks the door to make it work and his first words are "Sod it, the bloody thing's stuck again". Years later, when the merchandising took off, the Golden Bear company wanted a Clanger and a Clanger phrase for it to make when you squeezed it, they got "Sod it, the bloody thing’s stuck again"!"

John Du Prez, who wrote some of the music for Monty Python (another show Michael Palin was in) composed the score for the 2015 series.

Episodes from the original series

Series 1 (1969–1970)
The first series was transmitted on BBC1 at 5:55pm, except for the episode "Chicken" which went out at 5:50pm because there was a Children in Need appeal at 6:00pm.

Series 2 (1971–1972)
The second series episodes were also transmitted weekly on BBC1, but in a wide variety of differing timeslots. Episodes 1 and 2 were seen at 4:50pm; episodes 3, 5 and 6 at 5:05pm; episodes 4 and 8 at 5:00pm; episode 7 at 4:40pm; episode 9 at 5:30pm; and episodes 10, 11, 12 and 13 (which followed episode 9 after a gap of more than a year) at 4:00pm.

Specials

The first of these was an election special, produced in 1974, entitled "Vote for Froglet". Inspired by what Postgate referred to as the "Winter of Discontent" (a phrase from Shakespeare's play Richard III, usually employed to refer to the winter of 1978–79, but Postgate was referring to the miners' strike in the winter of 1973-74), and inspired partly by his recollections of post-war Germany, it was broadcast on the night of the October 1974 General Election. The narrator explains the democratic process, and demonstrates it by asking the Clangers to vote between the Soup Dragon and a Froglet. The Soup Dragon wins the election on a policy of "No Soup for Froglets", but the Clangers are dissatisfied with the result. This special was believed to be a lost episode for many years, but it was released in full for free by the British Film Institute to coincide with the 2017 UK General Election.

Episodes from the revival series

Series 1 (2015–2016)
Episodes 1–26 were first broadcast at 5:30pm,
while episodes 27–52 were at 6:00pm on CBeebies.

Following the March 2015 special, a full series was commissioned for the summer of that year. The series was narrated by Michael Palin, and co-produced by Smallfilms with the involvement of Peter Firmin and Oliver Postgate's son, Dan. The series was directed by Chris Tichborne and Mole Hill, with music composed by John Du Prez. 52 11-minute episodes were commissioned. The voices of the Iron Chicken, the Soup Dragon, and the Baby Soup Dragon were by Dan Postgate.

The first episode of the new series aired on 15 June 2015. It turned out to be a massive hit for CBeebies. The BBC News Entertainment and Arts magazine revealed that 65% of the episode's viewing audience of 484,000 were adults, and that it was CBeebies' most watched programme of 2015 up to that date. The rating was more than double the previous record, set by an episode of Alphablocks, Numberjacks, Waybuloo, Fimbles, Charlie and Lola, Teletubbies, The Lingo Show and The Octonauts that year, as well as other CBeebies favourites since the station's launch in 2002, although an episode of Numberjacks peaked at over 1 million back in 2009.

The same year, William Shatner was chosen to be the American narrator for the series airing on the cable network Sprout.

Series 2 (2017-2018)
A second series of the revival, and the fourth series overall, was released on 11 September 2017 with 26 more episodes.

Series 3 (2019-2020)
A third series of the revival, and the fifth series overall was broadcast on CBeebies on 17 July 2019 with another 26 more episodes.

Specials

Reception
Although not quite as popular as Bagpuss (which in 1999 was voted in a British television poll the best children's television programme ever made), since the death of Postgate in December 2008 interest has been revived in his work, which is considered to have had a notable influence on British culture throughout the 1960s, 1970s and 1980s. In 2007, Postgate and Firmin were jointly presented with the Action for Children's Arts J. M. Barrie Award "for a lifetime's achievement in delighting children".

Legacy

The Soup Dragons, a Scottish alternative rock band of the late 1980s and early 1990s, took their name from the Clangers character.

In the 1972 Doctor Who serial "The Sea Devils", The Master is seen to be watching the episode "The Rock Collector". He states that they are fascinating creatures and even mimics their language. He is told that they are just television characters. The Master rolls his eyes; he was obviously joking and knows full well they are puppets.

A Clanger (as a glove-puppet rather than a stop-motion puppet) appears as a member of the "Puppet Government" in The Goodies TV episode "The Goodies Rule – O.K.?".

From the block's start until its discontinuation, the UK's Nick Jr. Classics block aired Clangers episodes specifically for parents who remembered the show.

Tiny Clanger (also as a glove-puppet) appeared on Sprout's Sunny Side Up Show in honour of the U.S. premiere of Clangers.

Other countries
The series was not widely broadcast outside the UK in the 1970s, mainly because it did not require additional money from sales abroad to finance its production. However the Norwegian Broadcasting Corporation showed the series in 1970 and 1982, entitled Romlingane. It was narrated by Ingebrigt Davik, a popular author of children's books. It was shown on Swedish television in the late 1960s and 1970s, entitled Rymdlarna. The first 13 episodes were also shown on Czechoslovak Television in August 1972, entitled Rámusíci as a part of the children's evening program slot Večerníček.

The revived version in 2015 has received funding from Sprout, a subsidiary of NBCUniversal, and has been pre-sold to other foreign broadcasters including the Australian Broadcasting Corporation. The American transmissions are narrated by William Shatner.

As from 2018, it is also broadcast on the Belgian channel Ketnet.

Soundtrack album

In 2001, a selection of the music and sound effects was compiled by Jonny Trunk from 128 musical cues held by Postgate, who contributed act one, "The Iron Chicken and the Music Trees", of A Clangers Opera, with libretto that he had compiled.

Track listing
Intro Music and Dialogue from "Episode One"
The Start Of "Music"
From "Visiting Friends"
"Clangers running around the planet!"
From "Fishing"
From "Treasure"
"Some Musical Sequences"
From "Goods" (when the machine in the episode "Goods" went into continuous production of plastic objects)
"An End Title"
"Tiny Clangers Radio Hat"
"Some of Oliver's Special Clangers Effects including the Froglets"
From "The Rock Collector"
From "Glowhoney"
From "Teapot"
From "Cloud"
From "The Seed"
From "The Bags"
From "Blow Fruit"
From "The Pipe Organ"
From "The Music of the Spheres"
"A short, silent interval"
"A Clangers Opera, Act One" "The Iron Chicken and the Music Trees" (compiled by Oliver Postgate)

Home media
In the early 1990s, three VHS cassettes of the Clangers were released by BBC Enterprises Ltd. Later, another six cassettes were released by Universal Pictures. A number of DVDs have also been released by Universal Pictures (original series) and Signature Entertainment (revived series).

VHS

DVD

References

External links
 
 Clangers at BBC Online
 Clangers at Sprout
 A copy of the moon landing hoax parody
 Link to Clive Banks interview with Oliver Postgate about Election Special
 British Film Institute Screen Online
 Knit your own Clanger
 A short clip from Vote for Froglet at BBC Online
  - the original series
  - the revived series
 Link to BunnyEars.tv, complete Clangers episodes for viewers in North America

1969 British television series debuts
1974 British television series endings
2015 British television series debuts
1960s British animated television series
1970s British animated television series
2010s British animated television series
1960s British children's television series
1970s British children's television series
2010s British children's television series
British stop-motion animated television series
British children's animated space adventure television series
British children's animated science fiction television series
English-language television shows
BBC children's television shows
Animated television series about extraterrestrial life
Animated television series about dragons
Television series by Smallfilms
Television series set on fictional planets
CBeebies
British television series revived after cancellation